Dawid Kamiński (born 13 February 1995) is a Polish footballer who plays as a midfielder in Polish club Borek Kraków.

Club career
Kamiński made his debut for Wisła Kraków in the Ekstraklasa on 31 August 2012 in a match against Polonia Warsaw.

On 4 September 2018, he signed a contract with Motor Lublin.

References

External links
 
 Dawid Kamiński at Footballdatabase

1995 births
Living people
Polish footballers
Association football forwards
Wisła Kraków players
Widzew Łódź players
Motor Lublin players
Bruk-Bet Termalica Nieciecza players
Raków Częstochowa players
KSZO Ostrowiec Świętokrzyski players
Chojniczanka Chojnice players
Ekstraklasa players